Yak Attack is an annual high-altitude, long-distance mountain bike race. The race has been known to be non profit.  It takes place in Nepal, and is described as "the highest, toughest, mountain-bike race in the world". The eighth annual race took place in 2014.

Nowadays, the Yak Attack is part of a three-part world challenge.

References

External links

Adventure racing